The Intercollegiate Hockey League began as an agreement between Harvard, Princeton and Yale to play one another in best-of-three series.

History
As the Intercollegiate Hockey Association was collapsing, the three top college teams wanted to continue playing games against one another. After Harvard left the IHA in 1911 they scheduled both Princeton and Yale multiple times the following season. After Yale left the next year all three teams agreed to play two games against one another with a third used in case of a tie. After the collapse of the IHA and the suspension of Columbia's ice hockey in 1915, both Cornell and Dartmouth made overtures to join the league but after Cornell was forced to cancel any such plans due to financial constraints, nothing came to fruition for either program.

The league held together for five years before World War I caused both Princeton and Harvard to suspend their programs.

Members

Membership timeline

See also
 Intercollegiate Hockey Association
 Triangular Hockey League
 Pentagonal League

References

Defunct NCAA Division I ice hockey conferences
Sports in the Eastern United States